Sezemice is a municipality and village in Mladá Boleslav District in the Central Bohemian Region of the Czech Republic. It has about 100 inhabitants.

Administrative parts
The hamlet of Jirsko 1.díl is an administrative part of Sezemice.

Geography
It lies in the Jičín Uplands.

History
The first written mention of Sezemice is from 1115, when Duke Vladislaus I donated the village to the newly established monastery in Kladruby. The owners of the village included Jan Čapek of Sány and the Wartenberg family. From the mid-16th century until the 19th century, Sezemice was part of the Svijany estate and shared its owners, among whom were the families of Wartenberg, Schlick and Waldstein.

Sights
The main landmark of Sezemice is the Church of Saint Bartholomew. Its existence was first documented in 1352. In 1852–1856, the church was rebuilt into its current Empire form.

Notable people
Stanislav Libenský (1921–2002), contemporary artist

References

External links

Villages in Mladá Boleslav District